Asaphodes philpotti is a moth in the family Geometridae. It is endemic to New Zealand and has been found in the South Island as well as one observation in Wainuiomata in the North Island. This species inhabits native forest and larvae are hosted by species in the genera Hydrocotyle and Cardamine.

Taxonomy

This species was first described by Louis Beethoven Prout in 1927 and named Xanthorhoe philpotti. Prout named this species in honour of Alfred Philpott, the entomologist who recognised that two separate species were mixed as Xanthorhoe beata. In 1939 Prout placed this species in the genus Larentia. This placement was not accepted by New Zealand taxonomists. In 1988 J. S. Dugdale placed this species in the genus Asaphodes. The male lectotype, collected at  Lake Wakatipu, is held at the Natural History Museum, London.

Description

Prout stated that one of the distinguishing features between A. beata and A. philpotti  is the black discal spot on the forewings of A. beata which is absent or very faintly present on the forewings of A. philpotti.

Distribution
This species is endemic to New Zealand. This species has been collected at the type locality of Lake Wakatipu as well as in Dunedin, Wairaurahiri River in Southland, and Wainuiomata. It has also been observed on the West Coast as well as in Takaka. The range of this species has undergone contraction and it is now regarded as locally extinct in Invercargill.

Habitat 
The preferred habitat of this species is native forest.

Hosts
Larvae from this species have been reared on, and have also been observed feeding on, species in the genera Hydrocotyle and Cardamine.

References 

Moths described in 1927
Moths of New Zealand
Larentiinae
Endemic fauna of New Zealand
Taxa named by Louis Beethoven Prout
Endemic moths of New Zealand